Hasnain is a given name. Notable people with the name include:

Constance J. Chang-Hasnain, American electrical engineer, and John R. Whinnery Chair Professor at University of California, Berkeley
Maisam Hasnain (born 1977), former Pakistani cricketer
Seyed E. Hasnain (born 1954), Distinguished Professor of Biological Sciences at the Indian Institute of Technology, Delhi, India
Syed Ata Hasnain, Indian Army General officer
Syed Mahdi Hasnain, General in the Indian Army
Hasnain Gulamabbas Dewji, Member of Parliament in the National Assembly of Tanzania
Hasnain Kazim, German journalist
Hasnain Khan (born 1996), Pakistani cricketer